The Nitrosopumilales are an order of the Archaea class Nitrososphaeria.

Phylogeny
Phylogeny of Nitrososphaerales

Taxonomy
The currently accepted taxonomy is based on the List of Prokaryotic names with Standing in Nomenclature (LPSN) and National Center for Biotechnology Information (NCBI)

Order Nitrososphaerales Stieglmeier et al. 2014
 Family "Methylarchaceae" Hua et al. 2019
 ?"Candidatus Methylarchaeum" Hua et al. 2019
 Family "Nitrosocaldaceae" Qin et al. 2016
 "Candidatus Nitrosocaldus" de la Torre et al. 2008
 Family Nitrososphaeraceae Qin et al. 2017
 "Candidatus Nitrosocosmicus" corrig. Lehtovirta-Morley et al. 2016
 Nitrososphaera Stieglmeier et al. 2014
 Family Nitrosopumilaceae Stieglmeier et al. 2014
 "Cenarchaeum" DeLong & Preston 1996
 Nitrosarchaeum corrig. Jung et al. 2018
 "Candidatus Nitrosopelagicus" Santoro et al. 2015
 Nitrosopumilus Qin et al. 2017
 "Candidatus Nitrosospongia" Moeller et al. 2019
 "Candidatus Nitrosotalea" Lehtovirta 2011
 "Candidatus Nitrosotenuis" Lebedeva et al. 2013

References

Further reading

Scientific journals

Scientific books

Scientific databases

External links

Archaea taxonomic orders
Archaea
Candidatus taxa